Cow Hollow may refer to:

Cow Hollow, San Francisco
Cow Hollow (Missouri)
Cow Hollow (Hickman County, Tennessee), a valley in Tennessee